Michael Brandner (born 13 February 1995) is an Austrian professional association football player who plays for FC Blau-Weiß Linz.

Career

Blau-Weiß Linz
On 14 June 2019, Brandner joined FC Blau-Weiß Linz on a 2-year contract.

Honours 
FC Liefering
Runner-up
 Austrian Football First League: 2014–15

References

External links 

 

1995 births
Living people
Austrian footballers
Austria youth international footballers
Association football midfielders
Austrian Football Bundesliga players
2. Liga (Austria) players
FC Liefering players
SV Ried players
SC Wiener Neustadt players
FC Blau-Weiß Linz players